Farndon is a civil parish in Cheshire West and Chester, England.  It  contains 19 buildings that are recorded in the National Heritage List for England as designated listed buildings.  One of these is listed at Grade I, the highest grade, three at the middle grade, Grade II*, and the rest at the lowest grade, Grade II.  Apart from the village of Farndon, the parish is rural.  The listed buildings include houses in the village, the church and tombs in the churchyard, the ancient bridge crossing the River Dee, the former village lock-up, and a memorial.

Key

Buildings

See also
Listed buildings in Barton
Listed buildings in Churton by Aldford
Listed buildings in Churton by Farndon
Listed buildings in Coddington
Listed buildings in Shocklach Oviatt
Listed buildings in Stretton

References
Citations

Sources

Listed buildings in Cheshire West and Chester
Lists of listed buildings in Cheshire